Valfar, ein Windir is a 2-disc compilation album by Windir released in 2004. It contains some new recordings, tributes, live songs, and re-recordings. The money made with selling Valfar, ein Windir goes straight to Valfar's family. A version of the album that does not include the second disc was also released later.

Track listing
CD 1
"Stri" (Battle) – 1:25 (new recording)
"Stridsmann" (Warrior) – 5:54 (new recording)
"Dans på Stemmehaugen" – 6:29 (re-recording)
"The Profound Power" – 4:57 (re-recording; originally by Ulcus, previous band of Hvàll, Steingrim, Sture, Strom and Righ)
"Dauden" (Death) – 5:12 (performed by Enslaved)
"Ending" – 2:57 (performed by Finntroll)
"Mørkets Fyrste" (The Lord of Darkness) – 7:26 (performed by E-head)
"Destroy" – 4:56 (performed by Notodden All Stars)
"Likbør" – 5:26 (performed by Weh)
"Svartasmeden og Lundamyrstrollet" – 9:14 (live)
"Blodssvik" – 7:44 (live)
CD 2
"Soge II – Framkomsten" – 1:33
"Krigaren si Gravferd" – 6:24
"Sognariket Sine Krigarar" – 5:35
"Byrjing" – 3:17
"Arntor, ein Windir" – 6:56
"Saknet" – 10:03
"1184" – 5:28
"Journey to the End" – 9:34
"Martyrium" – 5:00
"Fagning" – 8:31
"On the Mountain of Goats" – 5:24
"Sóknardalr" – 5:45

References

Windir albums
2004 compilation albums
Compilation albums published posthumously